Leiter is a surname. Notable people with the surname include:

 A family of American baseball pitchers:
 Al Leiter (born 1965), left-hander
 Jack Leiter (born 2000), son of Al, right-hander
 Mark Leiter (born 1963), brother of Al, right-hander
 Mark Leiter Jr. (born 1991), son of Mark, right-hander
 Brian Leiter, American philosopher and legal scholar
 Felix Leiter, fictional character in the James Bond series
 Ken Leiter, American ice hockey player
 Levi Leiter, American businessman
 Mark Leiter (US Businessman), Chief Strategy Officer at Nielsen
 Michael Leiter, former director, National Counterterrorism Center
 Saul Leiter, photographer and artist

See also 
 Leiter, Wyoming, a community in the United States
 The Leiter Report, a report on university professors of philosophy edited by Brian Leiter
 The Second Leiter Building, also known as the Sears Building, in Chicago
 Leiter International Performance Scale, an intelligence test
 Leite
 Leitner
 Gauleiter, an administrator (leader) of a gau (district) in pre-World War II Germany